Waldzell is a municipality in the district of Ried im Innkreis in the Austrian state of Upper Austria.

Geography
Waldzell lies in the Innviertel. About 49 percent of the municipality is forest, and 46 percent is farmland.

References

Cities and towns in Ried im Innkreis District